No. 631 Squadron RAF was an anti-aircraft co-operation squadron of the Royal Air Force from 1943 to 1949.

History
The squadron was formed at RAF Towyn on 1 December 1943, from 1605 Flight and 1628 Flight for anti-aircraft co-operation duties, and operated a variety of aircraft in this role. On 10 May 1945 the squadron moved to RAF Llanbedr. It was disbanded on 11 February 1949 when redesignated No. 20 Squadron RAF.

Aircraft operated

Squadron bases

See also
List of Royal Air Force aircraft squadrons

References
Notes

Bibliography

External links
 History of No. 631 Squadron
 History of No.'s 621–650 Squadrons at RAF Web

Aircraft squadrons of the Royal Air Force in World War II
631 squadron
Military units and formations established in 1943
Military units and formations disestablished in 1949